The 1991 Nichirei International Championships was a women's tennis tournament played on outdoor hard courts at the Ariake Coliseum in Tokyo, Japan that was part of Tier II of the 1991 WTA Tour. It was the second edition of the tournament and was held from 16 September through 22 September 1991. First-seeded Monica Seles won the singles title and earned $70,000 first-prize money.

Finals

Singles
 Monica Seles defeated  Mary Joe Fernández 6–1, 6–1
 It was Seles' 7th singles title of the year and the 17th of her career.

Doubles
 Mary Joe Fernández /  Pam Shriver defeated  Carrie Cunningham /  Carrie Cunningham 6–3, 6–3

References

External links
 ITF tournament edition details
 Tournament draws

Nichirei International Championships
Nichirei International Championships
Nichirei International Championships
Nichirei International Championships
1991 in Japanese tennis